Donald Birmingham (born c. 1940) is a former American football and basketball coach. He served as the head football coach at Yankton College in Yankton, South Dakota from 1967 to 1969, the University of Dubuque in Dubuque, Iowa from 1977 to 1983, and McMurry College in Abilene, Texas, compiling a career college football coaching record of 63–51–2.

Birmingham graduated in 1962 from Westmar College in Le Mars, Iowa. At Yankton, he coached future National Football League (NFL) player Lyle Alzado. With Dubuque he twice garnered Iowa Intercollegiate Athletic Conference (IIAC) Coach of the Year honors, in 1979 and 1980.

Head coaching record

College football

References

1940s births
Year of birth missing (living people)
Living people
Dubuque Spartans football coaches
Eastern New Mexico Greyhounds football coaches
Long Beach State 49ers football coaches
McMurry War Hawks football coaches
Westmar Eagles football coaches
Westmar Eagles football players
Yankton Greyhounds football coaches
Yankton Greyhounds men's basketball coaches
Junior college football coaches in the United States
Iowa Lakes Lakers men's basketball coaches